Lewis Leavell Walker (February 15, 1873 – June 30, 1944) was a U.S. Representative from Kentucky.

Born in Lancaster, Kentucky, Walker attended Lancaster Academy, Garrard College in Lancaster, Kentucky, and Central University, Richmond, Kentucky.
He studied law.
He was admitted to the bar in 1894 and commenced practice in Lancaster, Kentucky.
He also engaged in banking.
He served as prosecuting attorney of Garrard County in 1901.
Walker served as city attorney of Lancaster 1907-1910.
He served as trustee of the University of Kentucky, at Lexington, Kentucky from 1908 to 1915.
He served as judge of the 13th judicial district of Kentucky in 1910 and 1911.

Walker was elected as a Republican to the Seventy-first Congress (March 4, 1929 – March 3, 1931).
He was not a candidate for renomination in 1930. Walker was preceded and succeeded in his congressional seat by the same person, Democrat Ralph Waldo Emerson Gilbert.

Walker continued the practice of law in Lancaster, Kentucky, until his death there on June 30, 1944.
He was interred in Lancaster Cemetery.

References 

 

1873 births
1944 deaths
American prosecutors
Kentucky state court judges
Republican Party members of the United States House of Representatives from Kentucky
People from Lancaster, Kentucky